Quod Erat Demonstrandum is a 2013 Romanian drama film directed by Andrei Gruzsniczki, starring Sorin Leoveanu and Ofelia Popii. It tells the story of two Romanian academics who are persecuted by Securitate, the secret police, in 1984. The title is a Latin phrase with the meaning "which had to be proven". The film is in black and white. It had a budget corresponding to 700,000 euro, of which 1.59 million Romanian leu came from the National Center for Cinema.

The film premiered at the Rome Film Festival where it won the Jury Special Prize. It won several other awards and was hailed as the best Romanian film of 2014 by several critics, but had fewer than 5000 admissions in its home country, which was seen as a disappointment.

Cast
 Sorin Leoveanu as Sorin Pârvu
 Ofelia Popii as Elena Buciuman
 Florin Piersic Jr. as Alexandru Voican
 Virgil Ogăşanu as Martin Scăunaşu
 Marc Titieni as David Buciuman
 Dorian Boguță as Lucian Amohnoaiei
 Alina Berzunţeanu as Valeria Amohnoaiei
 Lucian Ifrim as officer Marinescu
 Dan Tudor as colonel Deleanu
 Mihai Călin as professor Dima
 Adina Cristescu as David's supervisor

Reception
Jay Weissberg of Variety wrote: "Leoveanu and Popii are known for their stage rather than cinematic work, yet they're ideally cast and exhibit zero theatricality. ... Black-and-white visuals have a suitable matte range, allowing for gradations in shadow and tone that wouldn't have been possible on digital or color stock. Cristian Niculescu's production design is uncanny, and Gruzsniczki does a commendable job integrating thesps with their surroundings in a way that feels completely natural."

References

External links 
 

2013 films
2010s historical drama films
Romanian black-and-white films
Films set in 1984
Films set in Bucharest
Romanian historical drama films
2010s Romanian-language films
2013 drama films